The 1999–2000 season was Clydebank's thirty-fourth season in the Scottish Football League. They competed in the Scottish First Division where they finished 10th and relegated to the Scottish Second Division. They also competed in the Scottish League Cup, Scottish Challenge Cup and Scottish Cup.

Results

Division 1

Final League table

Scottish League Cup

Scottish Challenge Cup

Scottish Cup

References

Clydebank
Clydebank F.C. (1965) seasons